Alexa von Schwichow (born 17 September 1975) is a German former judoka. She competed in the women's half-lightweight event at the 1996 Summer Olympics.

References

External links
 

1975 births
Living people
German female judoka
Olympic judoka of Germany
Judoka at the 1996 Summer Olympics
Sportspeople from Offenbach am Main